Unexpected Journey may refer to:

The Hobbit: An Unexpected Journey, a 2012 film — part one of the film adaptation of The Hobbit
Miracle Run (The Unexpected Journey), a 2004 film